Munir Said Thalib (8 December 1965 – 7 September 2004) was an Indonesian activist. Founder of the Kontras human rights organisation and laureate of the 2000 Right Livelihood Award, Munir was assassinated in 2004 while travelling to Utrecht University to pursue a master's degree in international law and human rights. He is one of Indonesia's most famous human rights and anti-corruption activists.

Political activist career
Munir was born into a family of Hadhrami Arab and Javanese origins, from Kathiri. He studied law at Brawijaya University in Malang in the province of East Java, and later started off his career in 1989 as a legal aid officer in the East Java provincial capital, Surabaya. He became one of Indonesia's leading human rights campaigners and faced intimidation, including death threats. He accused the Indonesian military of human rights violations in East Timor and in the troubled provinces of Papua and Aceh, and accused them of running a criminal network involved in illegal tree logging and drug smuggling.

He once fractured his hand whilst saving an elderly labourer from being beaten by security officials.

He founded the Commission for Missing Persons and Victims of Violence (KontraS). His last position was executive director of Indonesian Human Rights Monitor (IMPARSIAL), another Indonesian human rights NGO.

In 2001, while he was investigating Kopassus's role in kidnappings, a bomb package was delivered to his house.

Assassination and aftermath
Munir was poisoned with arsenic on a flight from Jakarta to Amsterdam on 7 September 2004. He was travelling on state-owned airline Garuda Indonesia. It was concluded from Munir's autopsy and eyewitnesses during the trial that he had died two hours before arrival in Schiphol International Airport. He took the arsenic during his flight transit in Singapore, or sometime near that time. In Singapore, Pollycarpus Priyanto, a Garuda pilot at the time and the prime suspect in Munir's trial, left the flight and then went back to Indonesia. Originally he departed from Indonesia by deadheading, with a fake document which allowed him to fly on another flight which was not his scheduled flight. Munir began to suffer acute diarrhea and bouts of vomiting shortly after his flight took off from Singapore to Amsterdam. The cabin crew informed the pilot in command that a passenger was sick, and a doctor who happened to be on the plane was asked to provide medical assistance. However, Munir died around two hours before the plane landed at Amsterdam's Schiphol airport.

When the results of the autopsy were released two months later, on 12 November, the Netherlands Forensic Institute revealed that Munir's body contained a level of arsenic almost three times the lethal dose. This was later confirmed by Indonesian police.

There were three suspects; Pollycarpus Budihari Priyanto, a former pilot who allegedly gave up his business class seat to Munir during the flight, and two flight attendants. It is alleged that Pollycarpus placed the arsenic in Munir's orange juice, upon orders from Garuda's chief executive at that time, Indra Setiawan.

Indonesian president Susilo Bambang Yudhoyono proclaimed that he will make sure that Munir's killers are brought to justice and quickly convened an independent investigation. However support and resources for the investigation waned, senior officials refused to comply, and the findings were never released.

In December 2005, Pollycarpus Budihari Priyanto was found guilty of Munir's murder by an Indonesian court and sentenced to fourteen years imprisonment. Munir's supporters claim that Pollycarpus was acting on orders and that this was not brought out during the court case.

In October 2006, the Supreme Court of Indonesia invalidated the conviction against Pollycarpus, citing insufficient evidence. However, in April 2007, police presented new evidence to prosecutors implicating Pollycarpus .

In October 2007, Indra Setiawan and his deputy, Rohainil Aini, faced trial for providing Pollycarpus with fake documents to board Munir's flight from Jakarta to Singapore. They would have faced a possible death penalty. They were both convicted and imprisoned for Munir's murder, and have appealed their convictions.

In 2007, a Jakarta court found that Garuda was negligent in refusing to perform an emergency landing, and ordered the company to pay 600 million rupiah in compensation to Munir's widow. When Garuda appealed this decision, the supreme court increased the compensation to an undisclosed amount. Garuda then failed to pay the compensation.

In November 2014, Pollycarpus was released from prison.

State Intelligence Agency (BIN) involvement in assassination
Top-level Indonesian State Intelligence Agency (BIN) officials were implicated in Munir's murder. The chief of police at the time, Sutanto, allegedly knew of the BIN involvement. A BIN deputy chairman, Muchdi Purwopranjono, was tried and acquitted for the murder in what has been internationally condemned as a "sham trial". Prosecutors accused Muchdi of ordering the killing out of anger over Munir's criticisms of his Kopassus leadership. Prior to the murder Pollycarpus made at least 26 calls to Muchdi, and a number of calls to a confidential BIN line.

A United States diplomatic cables leak alleged that former BIN chief A. M. Hendropriyono "chaired two meetings at which Munir’s assassination was planned" and that a witness at those meetings told police that "only the time and method of the murder changed from the plans he heard discussed; original plans were to kill Munir in his office." When Hendropriyono was first appointed to the BIN it was bitterly condemned by Munir, who was guiding an investigation into Hendropriyono's role in human rights abuses for a prosecution.

Muchdi and Hendropriyono were both summoned for questioning by a presidential fact-finding team, but they refused to comply with the investigation. Recommendations by the team for Hendropriyono's prosecution were completely ignored by the police and the attorney general's office.

In 2014, Hendropriyono admitted to journalist Allan Nairn that he bore "command responsibility" for the assassination, and he was ready to accept being put on trial.

Posthumous honours
Munir was posthumously awarded the Train Foundation's Civil Courage Prize, which recognizes "extraordinary heroes of conscience".

In 2013 a museum in Malang was opened in his honour.

Personal life
Munir was married to Suciwati, a labour rights activist at the time. They had two children. His wife is pursuing the investigation of Munir's assassination and works to keep Munir's case and human rights at the centre of Indonesian politics.

See also
 Human rights in Indonesia
 Activism
 Human Rights
 Indonesia
 International Humanitarian Law
 Right Livelihood Award
 Transparency International

References

External links

Munir Museum 
BBC News - Indonesia widens Munir enquiry
Dateline Archives - Garuda's Deadly Upgrade
Indonesia pilot jailed for murder
"Munir: Vanguard of reform", Sidney Jones, The Jakarta Post, 10 September 2004
Washington Post - Airline Probed in Activist's Murder
Who Killed Munir?
Munir's Widow Calls on Indonesia to Hold His Govt. Killers Responsible - video report by Democracy Now!

People from Batu, East Java
Indonesian people of Yemeni descent
Javanese people
Garuda Indonesia
University of Brawijaya alumni
Indonesian activists
Indonesian human rights activists
Assassinated activists
Deaths from arsenic poisoning
Assassinated Indonesian people
1965 births
2004 deaths
2004 murders in Indonesia
2004 murders in the Netherlands